Pullover, pull-over or pull over may refer to:

 Sweater or hoodie, a piece of clothing "pulled over" the head instead of buttoned or zipped-up
 Pullover (TV series), early-1980s UK children's television programme 
 Pullover Productions, UK producer of Pullover TV series
 A scenic overlook, road shoulder or layby where a motorist can pull over out of through-traffic lanes
Pullover (exercise), a weight-training exercise
 A traffic stop, a practice by police enforcement patrolling roadways
 "Pull Over", song on 2000 Trina album Da Baddest Bitch